The 2013 Campeonato Sudamericano de GT season (Southamerican GT Championship) was the final season of Campeonato Sudamericano de GT replacing the Campeonato Brasileiro de GT. The season began on May 4 at São Paulo Street Circuit and ended on November 3 at Autódromo Oscar y Juan Gálvez. This year the series has a class for a mixed team of professional and amateur (GT3 Pro-Am), and a class for gentleman drivers (GT3 GTR). The Brazilian Auto Racing Confederation ranking system for drivers was utilized in determining what class each entry was eligible for. The GT4 category remained its own class.

Entry list
All drivers were Brazilian-registered.

Race calendar and results
All races were held in Brazil, excepting the round at Autódromo Juan y Oscar Gálvez, that was held in Argentina

Championship standings
Points were awarded as follows:

References

External links

Campeonato Brasileiro de GT